The 2018 CFU Women's Challenge Series was a football competition in the Caribbean region, held amongst the women's national teams whose football associations are affiliated with the Caribbean Football Union (CFU), a sub-confederation of CONCACAF.

The competition was announced by the CFU in March 2018. It is the third women's competition organized by the CFU, after the 2000 CFU Women's Caribbean Cup and the 2014 CFU Women's Caribbean Cup. It is played in April 2018 across five venues, and serves as preparation for the CONCACAF Championship and World Cup qualifiers starting in May. Unlike the two previous CFU Women's Caribbean Cup tournaments, there is no final round and thus no overall champion.

Teams
A total of 20 teams (out of 31 CFU members) entered the competition.

 (H)

 (H)
 (H)

 (H)

 (H)

Notes
(H): Group hosts

Did not enter

Groups
The 20 teams are divided into five groups of four. In each group, teams play each other once at a centralised venue. Medals are awarded to each group winner and runner-up.

Group A
Host venue: Warner Park Sporting Complex, Basseterre, Saint Kitts and Nevis (all times UTC−4)

Group B
Host venue: UWI-JFF Captain Horace Burrell Centre of Excellence and Waterhouse Stadium, Kingston, Jamaica (all times UTC−5)

Group C
Host venue: Stade Sylvio Cator, Port-au-Prince, Haiti (all times UTC−4)

Note: Due to withdrawal of two teams, the remaining two teams play each other twice.

Group D
Host venue:  Sir Vivian Richards Stadium, North Sound, Antigua and Barbuda (all times UTC−4)

Group E
Host venue: Ato Boldon Stadium, Couva, Trinidad and Tobago (all times UTC−4)

Goalscorers
7 goals
 Batcheba Louis

5 goals
 Orthea Riley

4 goals

 María Pérez
 Karyn Forbes

3 goals

 Kai Jacobs
 Roneisha Frank
 Melissa Dacius
 Sherly Jeudy
 Phiseline Michel
 Aaliyah Prince

2 goals

 Portia Davis
 Rachel Peláez
 Roseline Éloissaint
 Shanelle Arjoon
 Jonelle Cato
 Natasha St. Louis

1 goal

 Rianna Cyrus
 Felicia Jarvis
 Lilian Pérez
 Francis Riquelme
 Nuhely Emerenciana
 Diante Scheepers
 Samantha Statia
 Sari Finn
 Michlyn Morgan
 Kasika Samuel
 Merrisa Charles
 Sheranda Charles
 Kristal Julien
 Tracy Albina
 Mégane Pierre-Justin
 Mariam El-Masri
 Brittany Persaud
 Tiandi Smith
 Isnada Lebrun
 Kethna Louis
 Nelourde Nicolas
 Shantel Bailey
 Roshana Palache
 Kevena Reid
 Brittney Lawrence
 Caroline Springer
 Leranja Wilkinson
 Ellaisa Marquis
 Sasha Prospere
 Saffira Hoogdorp
 Sabrina Rigters
 Ulstra Weegman
 Liana Hinds
 Shenieka Paul
 Mariah Shade
 Patrice Superville
 Tasha St. Louis

1 own goal

 Devikka Tittle (playing against Curaçao)

External links
Caribbean Cup, CFUfootball.org

References

2018
Women's Challenge Series
2018 in women's association football
April 2018 sports events in North America